Canal Dos is a Salvadoran television channel of Telecorporacion Salvadoreña. The channel broadcasts on channel 2 nationwide.

History

The channel started broadcasting on November 30, 1965. The channel's callsign is YSR-TV which is founded by Boris Eserski, owner of the YSR radio station.

Color transmissions commenced in 1973. It joined channels 4 and 6 in November 1986 to form Telecorporación Salvadoreña.

Currently it's one of the most popular channels of El Salvador.

Programming

The channel broadcasts between 05:25 and 01:00 on average. During the morning hours, channels 2, 4 and 6 transmit a networked morning block which consists of news bulletins, the so-called Cadena TCS.

At 12:00 PM (Local Time), the networked transmission ends and changed to a mix of lifestyle programming, news bulletins (Teledos) and telenovelas. In the middle of this mixture, the channel airs The Flintstones towards the end of the morning, one of the most popular animated series in the country, having been a "monument" on the channel.

The channel ends transmission 01:00 every night.

On weekends, the channel has a different focus, with TV shows taking most of the schedule.

Logos 

Television stations in El Salvador
1965 establishments in El Salvador
Telecorporación Salvadoreña
Spanish-language television stations
Television channels and stations established in 1965